Demetrida lateralis is a species of ground beetle in Lebiinae subfamily. It was described by Broun in 1910 and is endemic to New Zealand.

References

Beetles described in 1910
Beetles of New Zealand
lateralis